= Evangeline Heartz =

American politician

Evangeline Heartz was a state representative in Colorado. She represented Denver. She was first elected to the state house in 1896. She was a Populist Party candidate.

She opposed capital punishment and introduced a bill to ban hanging as a punishment in Colorado.
